Durga is a raga in Hindustani Classical music. It shares some features with Shuddha Saveri of Carnatic music (such as the note positions), but is significantly different from it in terms of the sancharas of the raga.

Unless mentioned otherwise, notes refer to the concept of notes in Indian classical music, called ‘swara’ in Hindustani.
Durga raga evokes the sringara rasa – romantic love.

Technical description

Notes and features 
 All swaras used are suddha
 Gandhar and Nishad are not used.

Example composition 
R m P D ; P D m ; m P D D m ; D m P D S' ; D D S' S' D D m; m P D ; m R, D S;
Here m is Shuddha Madhyam, M is  Madhyam but this is not used in Durga at all.

Samay (time) 
Second Prahar of night : 9:00 p.m. to midnight

Comparable to

Malhar 
Durga has the same notes as Malhar, another popular raag and one of old pedigree. The aural experience of both are significantly different. Technically, they are made apart by the use of rishabh (Re). Durga is also readily distinguished by its salient use of the phrase Sa Re Dha Sa

1) Common phrase Re Pa, distinguished by the use of Re
Both Durga and Malhar have the Re Pa pairing, however, the Re Pa cohort in Malhar involves a repetition of Re twice or thrice. More importantly the Re has a kaṇ of shuddha madhyam. (ma)
 Malhar: Ma Re Re Re[ma] Pa
 Durga: Ma Pa Dha Sa’ Re Dha Pa Dha Ma Re Pa.
Here, in Malhar, the transition between Re to Pa, the Re has a kaṇ of ma, and is not independently pronounced. The ma is shown stuck to Re in square brackets.
Stylistically, the duplication of ‘Re’ is also noted.

2) Different phrases
Also present in the pakad of the raag, Sa Re, Dha Sa is the quintessential phrase of Durga, which is not present in Malhar. (dha denotes dhaivat (dha) of the lower octave i.e. mandra saptak)

Jaldhar Kedar 
Jaldhar Kedar is a variant of, the major raag Kedar , and a part of the raagang of its namesake.

Film songs

Bollywood songs 
Geet gaya pattharo ne - Geet Gaya Patharon Ne (1964)
Chanda re mori patiya le ja - Banjaarin
Vrindavan ka Krishna Kanhaiya - Miss Mary
Hum intezaar karenge – Bahu Begam
Be Nazaara -  Mom

Language:Tamil

References

External links 
 More details about raga Durga
 Durga, ITC Sangeet Research Academy 

Hindustani ragas